Holloway Press was established at the University of Auckland in the Library of the Tamaki Campus in 1994. Poet Alan Loney was responsible for printings until 1998, and books are now almost wholly designed, printed and bound by Tara McLeod under the direction of Dr. Peter Simpson.

The Holloway Press has received assistance from the University Development Fund for its activity within the Faculty of Arts. Its policy is "to publish a range of texts appropriate to the technology of hand-printing which have unusual literary, artistic, scholarly and/or historical interest and which are unsuitable for commercial publication".

References

Further reading
Holloway Press records. 25 August 2016. University of Auckland.

University presses of New Zealand
University of Auckland
Book publishing companies of New Zealand
Publishing companies established in 1994
Mass media in Auckland
Private press movement
New Zealand companies established in 1994